Abu Ishaq al-Isfara'ini was a medieval Sunni Islamic theologian, Shafi'i jurist, legal theoretician and commentator on the Qur'an. al-Isfara'ini's scholarship was focused on the sciences of Aqidah, Hadith and Fiqh. He was along with Ibn Furak the chief propagator of Sunni Ash'ari theology in Nishapur at the turn of the 5th Islamic century.

Biography 
Al-Isfara'ini was born in the town of Isfarayin in northwestern Khurasan. There is little known of his childhood except that he received a comprehensive Islamic education centered on Islamic jurisprudence, Islamic theology, and Aqidah (creed). In his youth, al-Isfara'ini traveled to Baghdad to further his studies and attended the lectures of some of the most famous Sunni scholars of his time including Bahili, Baqillani and Ibn Furak.

Al-Isfara'ini then chose to leave Baghdad and return to his native town of Isfarayin despite the esteem and favour shown to him by the scholars of Iraq. Later he accepted an invitation to Nishapur, where a school was built for him. From 411 AH he held sessions teaching hadith in the congregational mosque of Nishapur.

Views 
Al-Isfara'ini adhered to the Sunni Ash'ari school of theology and spent much of his time refuting the views of the Karramiyya sect who held anthropomorphic views of God.

Death 
Al-Isfara'ini died in the Islamic month of Muharram in  418 AH (February 1027 CE), and was buried in Isfarayin. His tomb continued to attract pious visitors in the 6th/12th century.

See also 
 List of Ash'aris and Maturidis

References

Asharis
Shafi'is
Sunni Muslim scholars of Islam
Year of birth missing
418 deaths